The 2022 Walsh Cup was the early-season tier 1 inter-county hurling competition based in the Irish province of Leinster. Seven counties compete – five from Leinster, Galway from Connacht and Antrim from Ulster.

Seven other counties from Leinster competed in the tier 2 and tier 3 Leinster competitions – see 2022 Kehoe Cup and Shield.

It took place in January 2022.  were the winners.

Competition format
The teams are drawn into one group of four teams and one group of three teams. Each team plays the other teams in their group once, earning 2 points for a win and 1 for a draw. The group winners advance to the final.

Fixtures and results

Group A

Group B

Final

References

Walsh Cup
Walsh Cup (hurling)